Stanley Guzorochi Kanu (born 17 January 1999) is a Nigerian footballer who plays as a winger for Marítimo.

Professional career
Kanu is a youth product of Diamond Academy in Nigeria, before finishing his development in Portugal with Portosantense. He began his senior career with Caçadores das Taipas in 2018, and followed that up with a stint with the amateur club GD Vilar de Perdizes. On 31 August 2020, he moved to the Marítimo B team. He made his professional debut with the senior Marítimo side as a late substitute in a 1–1 Primeira Liga tie with Rio Ave on 23 December 2022.

References

External links
 

1999 births
Living people
Sportspeople from Lagos
Nigerian footballers
Clube Caçadores das Taipas players
C.S. Marítimo players
Primeira Liga players
Campeonato de Portugal (league) players
Association football wingers
Nigerian expatriate footballers
Nigerian expatriates in Portugal
Expatriate footballers in Portugal